is a limited express train service operated by Hokkaido Railway Company (JR Hokkaido) between  and  in Hokkaido, Japan.

Stops 
Trains stop at the following stations:

 -  -  -  -  -  -  -  -  -  -  -  -  -  - 

 Train becomes a Local Train between Higashi-Muroran station and Wanishi station.
 Suzuran No. 2 terminates at Higashi-Muroran.
 Suzuran No. 5 starts from Higashi-Muroran.

Rolling stock
Services are formed of 5-car 785 series and 789-1000 series EMUs. All seats are non-reserved, except for car 4, which has improved "u-Seat" accommodation, including AC outlets for personal use.

Formations
Trains are formed as shown below, with car 1 at the Muroran end.

From July 1992 until 30 September 2007, Suzuran services were formed of 4-car 781 series EMUs, with one reserved car (car 4), formed as shown below.

See also
 List of named passenger trains of Japan

References

 JR Timetable, December 2008

External links

 JR Hokkaido Suzuran train information 

Named passenger trains of Japan
Hokkaido Railway Company
Railway services introduced in 2006